The Three Sisters are an unusual rock formation in the Blue Mountains of New South Wales, Australia, on the north escarpment of the Jamison Valley. They are located close to the town of Katoomba and are one of the Blue Mountains' best known sites, towering above the Jamison Valley. Their names are Meehni (922 m), Wimlah (918 m), and Gunnedoo (906 m).

The formation receives more than 600,000 visitors per year.

Formation

The Three Sisters were formed by land erosion around 200 million years ago during the Triassic period when the sandstone of the Blue Mountains was eroded over time by wind, rain and rivers, causing the cliffs surrounding the Jamison Valley to be slowly broken up. 

When the Blue Mountains were covered in seawater, the ocean carried large amounts of sediment that gradually sunk to the floor in crosswise layers. These layers later created rock beds and shales. Around 200 million years ago, volcanoes erupted through the coal, sandstone and shale layers, forming the ridges and the shape of the Three Sisters.

Aboriginal legend
The commonly told legend of the Three Sisters is that three sisters, Wimalah, Meeni, and Gunedoo, lived in the Jamison Valley as members of the Katoomba tribe. They fell in love with three men from the neighbouring Nepean tribe, but marriage was forbidden by tribal law. The brothers were not happy to accept this law and so decided to capture the three sisters. A major tribal battle ensued, and the sisters were turned to stone by an elder to protect them, but he was killed in the fighting and no one else could turn them back.  

This legend is commonly claimed to be an Indigenous Australian Dreamtime legend. However, the legend as is commonly told may be traced back to non-indigenous 16-year-old schoolgirl Patricia Stone, who gave the formations their "indigenous" names.

The Aboriginal traditional owners, the Gundungurra, have a different legend that includes the Sisters rock formation.

The Three Sisters were declared an Aboriginal Place in January 2014, making it the 98th place in New South Wales to be declared as such.

Giant Stairway
From nearby Echo Point, a bushwalking trail leads to the Three Sisters and down to the valley floor via more than 800 well-maintained steel and stone steps called "the Giant Stairway". Then a 1.5-hour walk on The Federal Pass trail leads to the base of Katoomba Falls and the Katoomba Scenic Railway. Walkers who don't wish to climb back to the top can take the Scenic Railway back to the plateau for a fee.

References

External links

 Panoramic view of the Three Sisters
 Article about the making of "The Giant Stairway"

 

Rock formations of New South Wales
Geography of the Blue Mountains (New South Wales)
Tourist attractions in the Blue Mountains (New South Wales)
Australian Aboriginal mythology